The Communist Organization of Angola (OCA) was a Maoist-oriented communist party in Angola. OCA was founded in 1975 by the Amilcar Cabral Committees (Comités Amilcar Cabral; CAC). The CAC were founded in 1974 inside the People's Movement for the Liberation of Angola (MPLA) and were excluded from the party in 1975. It opposed the MPLA government and what it called Soviet social-imperialism. It also called for withdrawal of Cuban troops. OCA was suppressed by the government.

The OCA published Vanguarda Operaria.

The group is now defunct.

References 

Defunct political parties in Angola
Political parties established in 1975
1975 establishments in Angola
Communist parties in Angola
Rebel groups in Angola
MPLA
Political parties with year of disestablishment missing
National liberation movements in Africa